Robert Akaruye (born 28 March 1981) is a Nigerian former football player. He previously played for Sivasspor in Turkey and represented Nigeria on one occasion.

Career
The Al Ahed striker suffered on Monday 14 December 2009 in a serious car accident on the road to the Beirut airport.

International career
He played his one and only cap for the Nigeria national football team on 20 June 2004 in Luanda against Angola.

Honour and titles

Individual
 2009 AFC Cup top scorer.

References

1981 births
Living people
Nigerian footballers
Nigeria international footballers
Expatriate footballers in Egypt
Al Mokawloon Al Arab SC players
Nigerian expatriates in Bahrain
Dolphin F.C. (Nigeria) players
Expatriate footballers in Lebanon
Lobi Stars F.C. players
Expatriate footballers in Bahrain
Nigerian expatriates in Egypt
Nigerian expatriate sportspeople in the United Arab Emirates
Al Ahed FC players
Association football forwards
Nigerian expatriate footballers
Nigerian expatriate sportspeople in Lebanon
Lebanese Premier League players
Sportspeople from Warri